Thórisson or Þórisson may refer to:

Andrea Thorisson (born 1998), Icelandic-Swedish footballer
Bergur Þórisson (born 1993), Icelandic musician, composer, audio engineer
Guðmann Þórisson (born 1987), Icelandic football player
Kristinn R. Thórisson, Icelandic artificial intelligence researcher

See also
Thoresen
Thoreson
Thoresson
Þórarinsson